Kapardar Bhotu Pande or Shatrubhanjan (born 1763)was a Nepalese politician, military personnel and courtier in the Kingdom of Nepal. He was member of the Gora Pande clan of Gorkha and the youngest son of Kaji Tularam Pande. Tularam had five sons. The name of three of them are - Jagajit Pande, Ranajit Pande and Bhotu Pande.

Ancestry

Kapardar Bhotu Pande installed an inscription on the Bishnumati bridge. The inscription explains his patrilineal relationship to Ganesh Pande, Minister of Drabya Shah, the first King of Gorkha Kingdom. The lineage mentions Ganesh Pande's son as Vishwadatta and Vishwadatta's son as Birudatta. Birudatta had two sons Baliram and Jagatloka. Bhotu Pande mentions Tularam, Baliram, and Birudatta respectively as his ancestors of three generations.

Career
Bhotu Pande was a military officer in the offence of Sino-Nepalese War. He had  served as a Kapardar in the royal palace.  His statue with bearded appearance can be found in the building located south of Pashupatinath. His son Balabhanjan Pande, was appointed Sardar with a Khangi of 80 khets of rice-lands and a khuwa revenue of Rs 1,600. He was required to maintain 22 fusiliers and 1 piece of cannon.

References

Bibliography

1763 births
Nepalese military personnel
People of the Anglo-Nepalese War
Gurkhas
History of Nepal
Pande family
People from Gorkha District
Nepalese Hindus